The Society of Goldsmiths, Jewellers and Kindred Trades was a trade union representing workers in the jewellery industry and related trades in the United Kingdom.

The union was founded in 1893, as the London Society of Goldsmiths and Jewellers.  It affiliated to the Trades Union Congress and to the Universal Alliance of Diamond Workers.  In the 1920s, it adopted its final name, and by 1950, it had 1,932 members.  In 1969, it merged into the National Union of Gold, Silver and Allied Trades.

General Secretaries
S. Lowen
1926: Arthur J. Raxworthy
1951: John C. West

References

Trade unions established in 1893
Trade unions disestablished in 1969
Trade unions based in London
Trade unions in the United Kingdom
Metal trade unions